The Last Rose is the debut studio album by contemporary classical vocalist Laura Wright. It was released on 25 July 2011 by Decca Records.

Idea and arrangement

In an interview, Wright said: “These songs have been passed on for generations. I was taught them by my grandmother when I was young but unless we continue that tradition, they will slip into oblivion.” The Last Rose was Laura Wright's way of reviving the folk tradition and continuing to pass down the songs for generations to come. Wright's album includes many classics such as "Scarborough Fair" and "My Bonnie Lies Over The Ocean" alongside basing one track ("Now Sleeps the Crimson Petal") on Alfred Lord Tennyson's poem of the same name. The song is a solo arrangement of Paul Mealor's adaptation of the hymn "Ubi Caritas" which was also performed at the Royal Wedding of Prince William and Kate Middleton.

Critical reception
Overall, the album has received mixed reviews, with The Independent's Andy Gill giving the album a poor review, whilst Simon Gage of the Daily Express called the album "really rather lovely stuff".

Track listing

Chart performance
The album topped the UK Classical Charts for five weeks from 31 July 2011. The album charted less successfully in the UK Albums Chart, peaking at number twenty four on 6 August 2011. It fell to 67 the following week, then fell to 71 the week after, before falling to 96 in its fourth week. The album then climbed back up to 69, before dropping out of the UK Top 100 completely after five weeks.

See also
List of Classical Artist Albums Chart number ones of the 2010s

References

2011 classical albums
Laura Wright (singer) albums